Lophopoeum freudei is a species of beetle in the family Cerambycidae. It was described by Gilmour in 1959.

References

Lophopoeum
Beetles described in 1959